Skeie is a Norwegian surname. Notable people with the surname include:

Birger Skeie (1951–2009), Norwegian businessperson
Eyvind Skeie (born 1947), Norwegian priest and author
Geir Skeie (born 1980), Norwegian chef and Bocuse d'Or winner
Tor Skeie (born 1965), Norwegian freestyle skier

Norwegian-language surnames